Close to the Sun is the fourth album of the melodic hard rock project Place Vendome. The songwriting for this album was provided by Magnus Karlsson (Primal Fear), Jani Liimatainen (Cain's Offering, ex-Sonata Arctica), Olaf Thörsen (Vision Divine, Labyrinth), Fabio Lione (Vision Divine, Angra, ex-Rhapsody of Fire), Simone Mularoni (DGM), Alessandro Del Vecchio (Hardline, Voodoo Circle), Aldo Lonobile (Secret Sphere) and Mike Palace (Palace).

This was the first Place Vendome album to feature guest guitar solos by Gus G (Firewind, Ozzy Osbourne), Kai Hansen (ex-Helloween, Gamma Ray, Unisonic), Mandy Meyer (Krokus, ex-Asia, Unisonic), Alfred Koffler (Pink Cream 69), Magnus Karlsson, Simone Mularoni and Michael Klein. It was released on 24 February 2017 with cover art credited to Stanis W. Decker.

Track listing

Personnel

Place Vendome
 Michael Kiske – vocals
 Dennis Ward – bass guitar, rhythm guitars, producer
 Dirk Bruinenberg – drums
 Gunther Werno – keyboards
 Uwe Reitenauer – rhythm guitars on "Close to the Sun", "Welcome to the Edge", "Hereafter", "Across the Times", lead guitars on "Close to the Sun"

Guest musicians
 Gus G (Firewind, Ozzy Osbourne) – guitar solo on "Light Before the Dark"
 Kai Hansen (Helloween, Gamma Ray, Unisonic) – guitar solo on "Riding the Ghost", "Across the Times"
 Magnus Karlsson (Primal Fear) – guitar solo on "Falling Star"
 Mandy Meyer (Krokus, ex-Asia, Unisonic) – guitar solo on "Helen"
 Alfred Koffler (Pink Cream 69) – guitar solo on "Welcome to the Edge"
 Simone Mularoni (DGM) – guitar solo on "Hereafter"
 Michael Klein – guitar solo on "Strong", "Breathing", "Yesterday Is Gone", "Distant Skies"
 Alessandro Del Vecchio - additional Choirs on "Strong"

Charts

References

External links
 Frontiers Records official website - P.V - Close to the Sun

2017 albums
Place Vendome (band) albums
Frontiers Records albums
Albums produced by Dennis Ward (musician)